Sam Beukema (born 17 November 1998) is a Dutch professional footballer who plays as a centre-back for AZ.

Career
Beukema made his Eerste Divisie debut for Go Ahead Eagles on 1 September 2017 in a game against Helmond Sport.

AZ Alkmaar
On 31 March 2021, Beukema signed a contract at AZ until 2026, joining the team as of July 2021.

References

External links
 
 

Living people
1998 births
Dutch footballers
Footballers from Deventer
Association football defenders
Eerste Divisie players
Go Ahead Eagles players
AZ Alkmaar players